Francisco I. Madero (1873‒1913) was a Mexican politician and revolutionary who served as the 33rd President of Mexico.

Francisco I. Madero may also refer to:

 Francisco I. Madero, Durango
 Francisco I. Madero, Coahuila
 Francisco I. Madero Municipality, Coahuila, the municipal seat
 Francisco I. Madero Municipality, Hidalgo